Anthonia Adenike Adeniji (born September 25, 1971) is a Nigerian academic. She is an associate professor of industrial relations and human resource management in the department of business management at Covenant University, Ogun State, Nigeria.

Early life and education 
Adeniji was in born on September 25, 1971, in Ota, Ogun State, she turned 49 years old in 2021. She completed a B.Sc. in business administration with upper second-class honours in 1995 at Olabisi Onabanjo University. She earned a Post Graduate Diploma in Financial Management (PGDFM) in 1997 at Obafemi Awolowo University where she completed a M.B.A. in 2000. In 2001, she studied at the Nigerian Institute of Management. She completed a P.H.D. in industrial relations and human resource management in 2011 at Covenant University. She entered into her profession as an academic after completing her formal education.

Career and research 
From 2010 to 2016, Adeniji was the head, academic programme, industrial relations and human resource management one of the three courses offered in the Department of Business Management, College of Business and Social Sciences at Covenant University. She was an examination officer in the department of business management from 2014 to 2016 when she became the PG coordinator of life-long learning in the same department. Adeniji is an associate professor of industrial relations and human resource management in the department of business management at Covenant University. She teaches courses in reward and compensation management, recruitment and selection, industrial relations, conflict resolution, e-recruitment and selection, e-training, collective bargaining, and retirement and pension administration. She supervises post graduate students at the doctoral and master's level. Adeniji is a member of the Nigeria Institute of Management (AMNIM), Chartered Institute of Administration, and the Chartered Institute of Personnel Management (MCIP).

Adeniji researches human resource management, collective bargaining, industrial relations, corporate reward management, trade unions and employers' associations, training and development, and human resource planning. Adeniji is a researcher with 36 publications in Scopus, 89 citations with an h-index of 5. She undertakes peer reviews for the Wiley Journal of Public Affairs and for SAGE Open.

Publications 
Adeniji has published journal articles, most of which are indexed in Scopus. She has also authored a book on human resource management.

References

External links
 

Living people
1971 births
People from Ogun State
Olabisi Onabanjo University alumni
Obafemi Awolowo University alumni
Covenant University alumni
Academic staff of Covenant University
Nigerian women academics
Nigerian Christians
21st-century Nigerian educators
21st-century women educators